Bernard Zimmer (30 April 1893 – 2 July 1964) was a French screenwriter who worked on over thirty films between 1932 and 1956.

Selected filmography
 The Battle (1934)
 Liliom (1934)
 Carnival in Flanders (1935)
 Second Bureau (1935)
 Life Dances On (1937)
 Travelling People (1938)
 The Chess Player (1938)
 Night in December (1941)
 The Materassi Sisters (1944)
 The Captain (1946)
 Thirst of Men (1950)
 Judgement of God (1952)
 Marie Antoinette Queen of France (1956)

Bibliography
 Low, Rachael. ''History of the British Film: Filmmaking in 1930s Britain. George Allen & Unwin, 1985 .

External links

1893 births
1964 deaths
French male screenwriters
20th-century French screenwriters
People from Ardennes (department)
20th-century French male writers